Jamele Mason (born October 19, 1989) is a Puerto Rican hurdler. In 2012 he was the NCAA runner up in the 400 meter hurdles and ranked within the top 20 in the world. At the 2012 Summer Olympics, he competed in the Men's 400 meters hurdles. He attended Texas Tech University Lubbock, Texas where he graduated magna cum laude with a degree in Corporate & Organizational Communications. Mason is the school record holder in the 400 meter hurdles being the only person in school history to run faster than 49 seconds. Mason's personal best is 48.89 which he ran at the 2012 NCAA championships. He was a member of the club Texas Tech Red Raiders.

Competition record

References
 

Puerto Rican male hurdlers
1989 births
Living people
Olympic track and field athletes of Puerto Rico
Athletes (track and field) at the 2012 Summer Olympics
Texas Tech Red Raiders men's track and field athletes